Qarah Yasar-e Pain (also Romanized as Qarah Yasar-e Pā’īn and Qareh Yasar-e Pā’īn) is a village in Zavkuh Rural District, Pishkamar District, Kalaleh County, Golestan Province, Iran. At the 2006 census, its population was 393, in 81 families.

References 

Populated places in Kalaleh County